Acinetobacter parvus is a Gram-negative, oxidase-negative, strictly aerobic bacterium from the genus Acinetobacter isolated from human clinical specimens.

References

External links
Type strain of Acinetobacter parvus at BacDive -  the Bacterial Diversity Metadatabase

Moraxellaceae
Bacteria described in 2003